Eido may refer to:
Eido (moth), a genus of moth in the subfamily Oecophorinae

People with the name
Eido I (955–1015), bishop of Meissen
Eido II (d. 1045 or -46), bishop of Meissen
Walid Eido (1942–2007), a Lebanese politician
Eido Tai Shimano (1932–2018), a Zen Buddhist master

See also
Iddo (prophet), a minor Hebrew prophet